This is a non-exhaustive list of symphony orchestras in Europe. For orchestras from other continents, see List of symphony orchestras.

Pan-European orchestras

 Chamber Orchestra of Europe
 European Medical Students' Orchestra and Choir
 European Union Youth Orchestra
 Spira Mirabilis

Austria

 Ars Antiqua Austria
 Bruckner Orchestra Linz
 Gustav Mahler Youth Orchestra
 Mozarteum Orchestra of Salzburg
 Symphony Orchestra Vorarlberg
 Tonkünstler Orchestra
 Vienna Chamber Orchestra (Das Wiener Kammer Orchester)
 Vienna Mozart Orchestra (Wiener Mozart Orchester)
 Vienna Philharmonic (Wiener Philharmoniker)
 Vienna Radio Symphony Orchestra
 Vienna Symphony (Wiener Symphoniker)
 Wiener Johann Strauss Orchester
 Wiener Jeunesse Orchester (national youth orchestra)

Baltic States

 Kremerata Baltica
 Baltic Sea Philharmonic

Belgium

 Antwerp Symphony Orchestra
 Brussels Philharmonic
 Brussels Philharmonic Orchestra
 National Orchestra of Belgium
 Orchestre Philharmonique de Liège
 Orchestre Royal de Chambre de Wallonie

Bosnia and Herzegovina

 Sarajevo Philharmonic Orchestra

Bulgaria

 Bulgarian National Radio Symphony Orchestra
 New Symphony Orchestra
 Plovdiv Philharmonic Orchestra
 Rousse Philharmonic Orchestra
 Sofia Symphonic Orchestra

Croatia

 Dubrovnik Symphony Orchestra
 Zagreb Philharmonic Orchestra

Czech Republic

 Barocco sempre giovane
 Bohemian Symphony Orchestra Prague
 Brno Philharmonic Orchestra
 Capellen Orchestra
 City of Prague Philharmonic Orchestra
 Czech National Symphony Orchestra
 Czech Philharmonic Orchestra
 Czech Symphony Orchestra (1994) (ČSO)
 Film Symphony Orchestra (FISYO), also known as Czech Symphony Orchestra during Live-Concerts
 Janáček Philharmonic Orchestra
 Moravian Philharmonic
 Praga Sinfonietta Orchestra
 Prague Philharmonia (PKF)
 Prague Philharmonic Orchestra
 Prague Radio Symphony Orchestra (SOČR)
 Prague Symphony Orchestra (FOK/PSO)
 Suk Chamber Orchestra
 Teplice Symphony Orchestra

Denmark

 Aalborg Symphony Orchestra
 Aarhus Symphony Orchestra
 Copenhagen Philharmonic Orchestra
 Danish National Chamber Orchestra
 Danish National Symphony Orchestra
 Danish Youth Ensemble (national youth orchestra)
 Odense Symphony Orchestra
 Royal Danish Orchestra (Det Kongelige Kapel)

Estonia

 Estonian National Symphony Orchestra

European Union

 European Union Baroque Orchestra
 European Union Youth Orchestra
 European Union Chamber Orchestra

Finland

Professional orchestras

 Helsinki Philharmonic Orchestra ("HKO", Finnish: Helsingin kaupunginorkesteri, Swedish: Helsingfors stadsorkester), founded in 1882
 Finnish Radio Symphony Orchestra ("RSO" (eng. "FRSO"), Finnish: Radion sinfoniaorkesteri, Swedish: Radions symfoniorkester), founded in 1927
 Tapiola Sinfonietta (Finnish: Tapiola Sinfonietta, Swedish: Tapiola Sinfonietta – Esbo stadsorkester), founded in 1987
 Lahti Symphony Orchestra (Finnish: Sinfonia Lahti – Lahden kaupunginorkesteri, Swedish: Sinfonia Lahti – Lahtis stadsorkester) founded in 1910
 Tampere Philharmonic Orchestra ("TFO", Finnish: Tampere Filharmonia – Tampereen kaupunginorkesteri, Swedish: Tampere Filharmonia – Tammerfors stadsorkester) founded in 1930
 Turku Philharmonic Orchestra (Finnish: Turku Filharmonia – Turun kaupunginorkesteri, Swedish: Åbo Filharmoniska Orkester – Åbo stadsorkester), founded in 1790
 Jyväskylä Sinfonia founded in 1955
 Oulu Symphony Orchestra (Finnish: Oulu Sinfonia – Oulun kaupunginorkesteri, Swedish: Oulu Sinfonia – Uleåborgs stadsorkester) founded in 1937
 Kymi Sinfonietta (Comprises Kouvola and Kotka City Orchestras) founded in 1999

Chamber orchestras

 Avanti! Chamber Orchestra (Finnish: Avanti! Kamariorkesteri, Swedish: Kammarorkester Avanti!), founded in 1983
Ostrobothnian Chamber Orchestra

University and conservatorio orchestras

 Ylioppilaskunnan Soittajat ("YS", English: Helsinki University Symphony Orchestra, Swedish: Helsingfors Universitets studentorkester), founded in 1747 (1926)
 The Polytech Orchestra ("PO", Finnish: Polyteknikkojen orkesteri, Swedish: Polyteknikernas orkester), founded in 1922

France

 Concerts Colonne (Paris), founded in 1873
 Concerts Lamoureux (Paris), founded in 1881
 Concerts Pasdeloup (Paris), founded in 1861
 Ensemble InterContemporain, founded in 1976
 Ensemble La Fenice, founded in 1990
 Ensemble Matheus, founded in 1991
 Les Musiciens du Louvre (Grenoble), founded in 1982
 Orchestre de la Société des Concerts du Conservatoire, founded in 1828, disbanded 1967
 Orchestre de Paris, founded in 1967
 Orchestre des Champs-Élysées (Poitiers), founded in 1991
 Orchestre Français des Jeunes (national youth orchestra)
 Orchestre National Bordeaux Aquitaine, founded in 1974
 Orchestre National d'Île-de-France, founded in 1974
 Orchestre National de France, founded in 1934
 Orchestre National de Lille, founded in 1976
 Orchestre National de Lyon, founded in 1905
 Orchestre National des Pays de la Loire, founded in 1971
 Orchestre national du Capitole de Toulouse, founded c.1932 
 Orchestre des Pays de Savoie, founded in 1984
 Orchestre Philharmonique de Radio France, 1937
 Orchestre philharmonique de Strasbourg, founded in 1855
 Orchestre symphonique de Mulhouse, founded in 1975
 Orchestre symphonique et lyrique de Nancy, founded in 1884
 Opéra Orchestre national Montpellier, founded in 2001
 Rouen Philharmonic Orchestra, founded in 1998

Germany
 National youth orchestras:
 Bundesjugendorchester
 Junge Deutsche Philharmonie

A–M

 Akademie für Alte Musik Berlin
 Akademische Orchestervereinigung
 Badische Staatskapelle
 Bamberg Symphony Orchestra (Bamberger Symphoniker)
 Bavarian Radio Symphony Orchestra (Symphonieorchester des Bayerischen Rundfunks)
 Bavarian State Orchestra (Bayerisches Staatsorchester)
 Berlin Philharmonic (Berliner Philharmoniker)
 Berlin Radio Symphony Orchestra (East Berlin) (Rundfunk-Sinfonieorchester Berlin)
 Berliner Symphoniker
 Bochumer Symphoniker
 Detmold Chamber Orchestra
 Deutsche Kammerphilharmonie Bremen 
 Deutsches Filmorchester Babelsberg
 Deutsche Radio Philharmonie Saarbrücken Kaiserslautern
 Deutsches Symphonie-Orchester Berlin
 Dortmunder Philharmoniker
 Dresden Philharmonic (Dresdner Philharmonie)
 Duisburg Philharmonic (Duisburger Philharmoniker)
 Frankfurter Opern- und Museumsorchester (Frankfurt Opera)
 Fulda Symphonic Orchestra (Fuldaer Symphonisches Orchester)
 Freiburger Barockorchester
 Gürzenich-Orchester Köln
 Hamburger Symphoniker
 Hannoversche Hofkapelle
 Hofer Symphoniker
 hr-Sinfonieorchester
 Jenaer Philharmonie
 Klassische Philharmonie Bonn
 Konzerthausorchester Berlin (formerly Berlin Symphony Orchestra)
 Leipzig Gewandhaus Orchestra (Gewandhausorchester Leipzig)
 Mahler Chamber Orchestra
 MDR Symphony Orchestra
 Mecklenburgische Staatskapelle
 Münchner Rundfunkorchester
 Munich Philharmonic (Münchner Philharmoniker)

N–Z

 NDR Radiophilharmonie (Hannover)
 NDR Elbphilharmonie Orchestra (Hamburg Elbphilharmonie)
 Neue Philharmonie Frankfurt (Offenbach am Main)
 Niedersächsisches Staatsorchester Hannover
 Norddeutsche Philharmonie Rostock
 Nordwestdeutsche Philharmonie
 Nuremberg Symphony (Nürnberger Symphoniker)
 Philharmonia Hungarica, founded by Hungarian exiles, disbanded 2001
 Philharmonie Festiva
 Philharmonisches Staatsorchester Hamburg
 Philharmonisches Kammerorchester Berlin
 Philharmonisches Staatsorchester Mainz
 Reuss Chamber Orchestra
 Southwest German Radio Symphony Orchestra
 Staatskapelle Berlin
 Staatskapelle Dresden (Sächsische Staatskapelle Dresden)
 Staatskapelle Halle
 Staatskapelle Weimar
 Staatsorchester Braunschweig (State Orchestra Brunswik)
 Staatsorchester Stuttgart
 Stuttgart Chamber Orchestra
 Stuttgart Radio Symphony Orchestra
 SWR Symphonieorchester
 WDR Rundfunkorchester Köln
 WDR Symphony Orchestra Cologne
 Württembergisches Kammerorchester Heilbronn

Greece

 Greek Youth Symphony Orchestra (national youth orchestra)
 Philharmonic Society of Corfu (Orchestra)

Hungary

 Budapest Festival Orchestra
 Budapest Philharmonic Orchestra
 Hungarian Radio Symphony Orchestra, also known earlier as Budapest Symphony Orchestra
 Hungarian National Philharmonic
 Philharmonia Hungarica, founded by Hungarian exiles, based in Germany; dissolved in 2001
 Szeged Symphony Orchestra
 Concerto Budapest Symphony Orchestra, artistic director and chief conductor is András Keller

Iceland

 Iceland Symphony Orchestra (Sinfóníuhljómsveit Íslands)

Ireland

 RTÉ National Symphony Orchestra
 RTÉ Concert Orchestra
 Irish Chamber Orchestra
 Hibernian Orchestra
 Camerata Ireland
 Dublin Philharmonic Orchestra
 Dublin Orchestral Players
 University College Dublin Symphony Orchestra
 National Youth Orchestra of Ireland (national youth orchestra)

Italy

 Accademia Filarmonica Romana, Rome
 Camerata de' Bardi, academic orchestra, Pavia
 I Musici, Rome
 I Solisti Veneti, Padua
 Orchestra del Maggio Musicale Fiorentino, Florence
 Orchestra dell'Accademia Nazionale di Santa Cecilia, Rome
 Orchestra di Piazza Vittorio
 Orchestra Filarmonica della Fenice, Venice
 Orchestra Giovanile Italiana (national youth orchestra)
 Orchestra i Pomeriggi Musicali, Milan
 Orchestra Sinfonica di Milano Giuseppe Verdi, Milan
 Orchestra Sinfonica Nazionale della RAI, Turin
 Orchestra Mozart, founded by Claudio Abbado in Bologna
 Orchestra Roma Sinfonietta, directed by Ennio Morricone
 Orchestra Sinfonica di Roma, Rome
 RCA Italiana Orchestra
 Rondò Veneziano, Venice
 Teatro San Carlo Orchestra, Naples
 Teatro Carlo Felice Orchestra, Genova
 Teatro dell'Opera di Roma Orchestra, Rome 
 Teatro Petruzzelli Orchestra, Bari 
 Teatro Comunale di Bologna Orchestra, Bologna
 Venice Baroque Orchestra

Latvia

 Latvian National Symphony Orchestra
 Liepaja Symphony Orchestra

Lithuania

 Klaipėda Chamber Orchestra
 Lithuanian National Symphony Orchestra
 Lithuanian State Symphony Orchestra
 Lithuanian Chamber Orchestra

Luxembourg

 Luxembourg Philharmonic Orchestra
 Luxembourg Sinfonietta

Malta

 Malta Philharmonic Orchestra

Moldova

 Moldovan National Youth Orchestra (national youth orchestra)

Monaco

 Monte-Carlo Philharmonic Orchestra

Montenegro

 Montenegrin Symphony Orchestra

The Netherlands

 National Youth Orchestra of the Netherlands (national youth orchestra)
 Holland Symfonia
 Metropole Orchestra
 Netherlands Philharmonic Orchestra
 Netherlands Radio Philharmonic
 Netherlands Chamber Orchestra
 Netherlands Radio Symphony Orchestra
 Netherlands Symphony Orchestra
 North Netherlands Symphony Orchestra
 Orchestra of the Eighteenth Century
 Residentie Orchestra
 Rotterdam Philharmonic Orchestra
 Royal Concertgebouw Orchestra
 Symfonisch Blaasorkest ATH

Norway

 Ungdomssymfonikerne (national youth orchestra)
 Norwegian Arctic Philharmonic Orchestra
 Bergen Philharmonic Orchestra
 Kristiansand Symphony Orchestra
 Norwegian Chamber Orchestra
 Norwegian Radio Orchestra
 Oslo Philharmonic Orchestra
 Oslo Sinfonietta
 Stavanger Symphony Orchestra
 Trondheim Symphony Orchestra

Poland

 Polish Sinfonia Iuventus Orchestra (national youth orchestra)
 Pomeranian Philharmonic (Bydgoszcz)
 Kraków Philharmonic Orchestra (Kraków)
 Łódź Philharmonic (Łódź)
 Polish National Radio Symphony Orchestra (Katowice)
 Polish Radio Symphony Orchestra (Warsaw)
 Polish Baltic Philharmonic (Gdańsk)
 Poznań Philharmonic (Poznań)
 National Forum of Music Symphony Orchestra (Wrocław)
 Silesian Philharmonic (Katowice)
 Sinfonia Varsovia (Warsaw)
 Sudecka Philharmonic (Wałbrzych)
 Warsaw Philharmonic Orchestra (Warsaw)
 Szczecin Philharmonic (Szczecin)
 Women's Orchestra of Auschwitz, youth orchestra at concentration camp (historic)

Portugal

 Gulbenkian Orchestra
 Portuguese Chamber Orchestra

Romania

 Banatul Philharmonic Orchestra (Timișoara)
 Bucharest Symphony Orchestra
 George Enescu Philharmonic Orchestra (Bucharest))
 Moldova Philharmonic Orchestra (Iași)
 National Radio Orchestra (Bucharest)
 Oltenia Philharmonic Orchestra (Craiova)
 Paul Constantinescu Philharmonic Orchestra (Ploiești)
 Romanian Radio Chamber Orchestra (Bucharest)
 Romanian Youth Orchestra (national youth orchestra)
 Sibiu Philharmonic Orchestra
 Transylvania State Philharmonic Orchestra (Cluj-Napoca)

Russia

 Mariinsky Theatre Orchestra
 Moscow Chamber Orchestra
 Moscow City Symphony Orchestra
 Moscow Philharmonic Orchestra
 Moscow State Symphony Orchestra
 Moscow Symphony Orchestra
 Moscow Virtuosi
 Murmansk Philharmonic Orchestra
 National Philharmonic of Russia
 Novosibirsk Youth Symphony Orchestra
 Osipov State Russian Folk Orchestra
 Persimfans
 Russian National Orchestra
 Russian Philharmonic Orchestra
 Sochi Symphony Orchestra
 Saint Petersburg Academic Symphony Orchestra
 Saint Petersburg Philharmonic Orchestra
 State Academic Symphony Orchestra of the Russian Federation
 State Symphony Capella of Russia
 State Symphony Cinema Orchestra
 Tchaikovsky Symphony Orchestra
 Ural Philharmonic Orchestra

Serbia

 Belgrade Philharmonic Orchestra
 Niš Symphony Orchestra

Slovakia

 Cappella Istropolitana
 Slovak Philharmonic
 Slovak Radio Symphony Orchestra
 Slovak Youth Orchestra (national youth orchestra)

Slovenia

 RTV Slovenia Symphony Orchestra
 Slovenian Philharmonic Orchestra

Spain

 Bilbao Orkestra Sinfonikoa
 Castile and León Symphony Orchestra
 Chamartín Symphony Orchestra
 Community of Madrid Orchestra
 Málaga Philharmonic
 Madrid Academic Orchestra
 Madrid Symphony Orchestra
 Orquesta Ciudad de Granada
 Orquesta Clásica Santa Cecilia
 Orquestra de Cadaqués
 Orquesta Filarmónica de Málaga
 Orquestra Simfònica de Barcelona i Nacional de Catalunya
 Orquesta Sinfónica de Burgos
 Orquesta Sinfónica de Galicia
 Orquesta Sinfonica de Tenerife
 Orquestra Simfònica del Gran Teatre del Liceu
 Orquestra Simfònica del Vallès
 Queen Sofía Chamber Orchestra
 Real Compañía Ópera de Cámara
 Real Orquesta Sinfónica de Sevilla
 RTVE Symphony Orchestra (based in Madrid)
 Sociedad de Conciertos de Madrid
 Spanish National Youth Orchestra (national youth orchestra)
 Orquesta Nacional de España (based in Madrid)
 Valencian Community Orchestra
 Valencia Orchestra

Sweden

 Gävle Symphony Orchestra
 Gothenburg Symphony Orchestra
 Kungliga Hovkapellet
 Malmö Symphony Orchestra
 Norrköping Symphony Orchestra
 Örebro Chamber Orchestra
 Royal Academic Orchestra
 Royal Stockholm Philharmonic Orchestra
 Stockholm Youth Symphony Orchestra
 Swedish Chamber Orchestra
 Swedish Radio Symphony Orchestra

Switzerland

 Basel Sinfonietta
 Berner Symphonie-Orchester
 Biel Solothurn Symphony Orchestra
 Camerata Bern
 Kammerorchester Basel
 Lucerne Festival Strings
 Luzerner Sinfonieorchester
 Orchester Musikkollegium Winterthur
 Orchestra della Svizzera Italiana
 Orchestre de Chambre de Lausanne
 Orchestre de chambre de Neuchâtel
 Orchestre de la Suisse Romande
 Sinfonieorchester Basel
 Tonhalle Orchester Zurich
 Zurich Chamber Orchestra
 Zurich Opera House Orchestra
 Zurich Symphony Orchestra

Turkey 

 Antalya State Symphony Orchestra
 Barış Youth Symphony Orchestra
 Bilkent Symphony Orchestra
 Borusan Istanbul Philharmonic Orchestra
 Bursa State Symphony Orchestra
 Cukurova State Symphony Orchestra
 Eskişehir Metropolitan Municipality Symphony Orchestra
 Istanbul State Symphony Orchestra
 Izmir State Symphony Orchestra* 
 Turkish Presidential Symphony Orchestra

Ukraine 

 Ukrainian Radio Symphony Orchestra
 National Symphony Orchestra of Ukraine
 Symphony Orchestra of the National Philharmonic of Ukraine
 Kyiv Symphony Orchestra
 Kyiv Classic Orchestra

United Kingdom

England

 Academy of Ancient Music
 Academy of St Martin in the Fields
 Alina Orchestra
 BBC Concert Orchestra
 BBC Philharmonic
 BBC Symphony Orchestra
 Bournemouth Sinfonietta
 Bournemouth Symphony Orchestra
 Britten Sinfonia
 Camerata of London
 City of Birmingham Symphony Orchestra
 City of London Sinfonia
 Docklands Sinfonia
 English Baroque Soloists
 English Chamber Orchestra
 English Concert
 Hallé Orchestra
 Huddersfield Philharmonic Orchestra
 Hull Philharmonic Orchestra
 Kensington Symphony Orchestra
 Kings Chamber Orchestra
 Leeds Symphony Orchestra
 Leicester Symphony Orchestra
 London Chamber Orchestra 
 London Classical Players
 London Festival Orchestra
 London Mozart Players
 London Philharmonic Orchestra
 London Shostakovich Orchestra
 London Sinfonietta
 London Symphony Orchestra
 Manchester Camerata
 National Youth Orchestra of Great Britain
 New London Orchestra
 Northern Sinfonia
 Orchestra of Opera North
 Orchestra of the Age of Enlightenment
 Orchestra of the City
 Oxford Philharmonic Orchestra
 Philharmonia
 Royal Liverpool Philharmonic Orchestra
 Royal Philharmonic Orchestra
 Sheffield Symphony Orchestra
 Sinfonia ViVA
 Sunderland Symphony Orchestra
 The King's Consort
 Worthing Symphony Orchestra
 Yorkshire Symphony Orchestra

Northern Ireland

 Ulster Orchestra

Scotland

 BBC Scottish Radio Orchestra
 BBC Scottish Symphony Orchestra
 National Youth Orchestra of Scotland
 Royal Scottish National Orchestra
 Scottish Chamber Orchestra
 Scottish Ensemble
 Scottish Festival Orchestra
 West of Scotland Schools Symphony Orchestra

Wales

 BBC National Orchestra of Wales
 Cardiff Philharmonic Orchestra
 National Youth Orchestra of Wales
 Welsh Sinfonia

References

Symphony orchestras in Europe

Symphony orchestras in Europe
Europe
Europe, symphony